Dr Hans Helmut Stoiber (11 October 1918 – 10 January 2015) was an Austrian poet. He was born in Zell am See. In 1936 he won a bronze medal in the art competitions of the Olympic Games for his "Der Diskus" ("The Discus").

References

External links
 profile 
 article and profile 
 Hans Stoiber's obituary 

1918 births
2015 deaths
20th-century Austrian poets
Austrian male poets
Olympic bronze medalists in art competitions
People from Zell am See
Medalists at the 1936 Summer Olympics
20th-century Austrian male writers
Olympic competitors in art competitions